Australia (the Wallabies) first played against the British & Irish Lions in 1899, winning 13–3 at the Sydney Cricket Ground, Sydney. There have been 23 Test matches between the two teams, with the Wallabies winning 6 of them and the British & Irish Lions 17. The most recent test, held at ANZ Stadium, Sydney, on 6 July 2013, finished in a 41–16 win for the Lions.

List of series

List of matches

See also

 Tom Richards Cup
 1888 British Lions tour to New Zealand and Australia

References

 
Australia national rugby union team matches
British & Irish Lions matches
Rugby union rivalries